Chrysiptera brownriggii, commonly known as the surge damselfish, is a species of marine fish. It is widespread in Indo-Pacific waters from East Africa to the Marquesas Islands and Society Islands, north to Japan and south to Australia. Its common name arises because it is associated with the rubble in channels created by tidal surges in reefs, but it is also found on reef flats and submerged terraces. It is territorial but is frequently encountered in groups. The identity of the person honoured by the specific name was not stated by Bennett in his original description but it is almost certainly Robert Brownrigg (1759-1833) who was governor of Ceylon where the type was collected.

References

External links
 

brownriggii
Fish of Thailand
Fish described in 1828
Fish of the Indian Ocean